BloodRayne 2 is an action hack and slash video game developed by Terminal Reality for PlayStation 2, Xbox and Microsoft Windows. It does not follow on directly from where BloodRayne finished; instead, it takes place 60 and 70 years later in a contemporary 2000s setting.

A remastered version titled BloodRayne 2: Terminal Cut was released on November 20, 2020, and later on PlayStation 4, PlayStation 5, Xbox One and Nintendo Switch as BloodRayne 2: ReVamped on November 18, 2021.

Plot
The FMV opens with a flashback set shortly after the first game. Rayne is seen entering a library (called Blood Library), with a few Nazis inside. She finds that Brimstone members have been slaughtered and realizes her vampiric father Kagan is here, acting as an influential Nazi. Rayne rushes to confront him for revenge for her mother's rape and the murder of her family, and Kagan mocks Rayne by saying he doesn't recognize her, as he sired numerous offspring that way. He finds what he was looking for, called the Vesper Shard. Knowing Rayne still wants to kill him, he then brings Professor Trumain up from the floor, strangled by his own small intestine, but barely alive. Kagan knows that they know each other, and that Trumain "stole" yet another offspring from him. While Kagan mocks Rayne, Truman pulls out a detonator, first giving time for Rayne to run, then detonating the grenade, killing himself and seemingly taking Kagan with him.

Denied the pleasure of killing him herself, Rayne spends the 60 years after the war seeking out and destroying Kagan's offspring. These offspring, Rayne's half-siblings, have banded together to form a group called the Cult of Kagan. The Cult has created the Shroud, a substance that can render sun rays harmless to vampires, allowing them to surface at all times of the day, and which twists nature into a nightmarish perversion  (trees dying almost instantly, grass catching on fire, corpses twitching). Using the Shroud, the Cult has pledged to create a new era of vampiric supremacy, continuing Kagan's legacy.

Rayne and her ally Severin find high ranking members of the Cult, who are responsible for hundreds of disappearances in a city. Rayne learns of their plot and defeats her ambitious half-sister Ferrill, the apparent leader of the cult. It's soon revealed that Kagan himself has long survived over the years and has come out of hiding. After Kagan has Ferrill dispatched, he sets about the plot to activate the Shroud, blocking out the sun and setting loose an army of vampires and demonic entities to destroy the city, making it his kingdom. Rayne again sets her sights on killing Kagan.

With Kagan's army having taken over the city, Rayne seeks out his tower to face him once and for all, fighting his army to get to him. A vengeful Ferrill makes an army of her own to usurp Kagan. After Rayne dispatches the last of her half-siblings, she confronts Kagan in his throne room, with Kagan mocking her one last time about the effort he took to create her. A fight ensues and Rayne kills her father, avenging her family.

Despite Kagan's death, the vampires still plague the city, and Severin suggests that Rayne should run it now. Brimestone declares martial law to rescue the surviving humans, cracking down hard on all vampires and more vampire overlords setting their sights on the city.

Reception

BloodRayne 2 received "average" reviews on all platforms, according to the review aggregation website Metacritic.

References

External links
 
 
 

2004 video games
Action video games
BloodRayne
Dieselpunk
Hack and slash games
Majesco Entertainment games
Nintendo Switch games
PlayStation 2 games
PlayStation 4 games
PlayStation 5 games
Third-person shooters
THQ games
Video games about vampires
Video game sequels
Video games about Nazi Germany
Windows games
Xbox games
Xbox One games
Video games about zombies
Single-player video games
Video games developed in the United States
Terminal Reality games
Video games about cults
Ziggurat Interactive games